Eugène Saccomano (23 September 1936 – 7 October 2019) was a French radio journalist and non-fiction author.

Biography
Eugène Saccomano was born on 23 September 1936 in Marseille, southern France.

Saccomano started his career as a journalist for Le Provençal. In 1959, he published Bandits à Marseille, a book about thugs in Marseille. The book was adapted into the 1970 film Borsalino starring Alain Delon and Jean-Paul Belmondo.

He became a radio journalist for Europe 1 in 1970. He focused on sports, especially football. In 2001, he joined RTL, another radio station. In 2012, he joined Sport365, a sports TV channel. He wrote his autobiography, Je refais le match, in 2005.

Bibliography
Bandits à Marseille (Omnibus, 1959).
Berlusconi, le dossier vérité (Éditions no 1, 1994).
Goncourt 1932 (Paris: Flammarion, 1999).
Je refais le match (Paris: Plon, 2005).
Les Stars de l'euro 2008 (Éditions Numéro 1, 2008).
Une romance marseillaise (Buchet Chastel, 2009).
Les stars de la Coupe du Monde 2010 (Éditions Numéro 1, 2010).
Le roman noir des Bleus (Éditions de la Martinière, 2010).
Céline coupé en deux (Le Castor astral, 2013).

References

1936 births
2019 deaths
Chevaliers of the Légion d'honneur
Mass media people from Marseille
French radio journalists
French sports journalists
French male non-fiction writers
French people of Italian descent